The Pisagua Case is the name given to the legal actions taken surrounding the crimes that occurred in the torture center and prison camp installed in the town of Pisagua, during the military dictatorship of Augusto Pinochet in Chile.

History

The judicial investigation began prior to the claim of illegal burial presented by the Vicariate of Solidarity, 31 May 1990 in the Pozo Almonte Court.

On 2 June 1990 the mass grave was found, located in the north-west sector of the Pisagua Cemetery. Twenty bodies were discovered within the grave, well-preserved due to the salt that permeates the sand in the area.

List of prisoners executed in Pisagua
The majority of the executed were found in 1990 during an investigation led by Minister Hernán Sánchez Marré.

Shot under the “Escape Law” 29 September 1973
 Juan Calderón Villalón
 Nolberto Cañas Cañas
 Marcelo Guzmán Fuentes
 Juan Jiménez Vidal
 Luis Lizardi Lizardi
 Michel Nash Saéz

Executed by the First War Council 11 October 1973
 Julio Cabezas Gacitúa
 José Rufino Córdova Croxatto
 Humberto Lizardi Flores
 Mario Morris Barrios
 Juan Valencia Hinojosa

Executed by the Second War Council 29 October 1973
 Rodolfo Fuenzalida Fernández
 Juan Antonio Ruz Díaz
 José Demóstenes Sampson Ocaranza
 Freddy Marcelo Taberna Gallegos

Executed by the Third War Council 29 November 1973
 Germán Palominos Lamas

Executed by the Fourth War Council 11 February 1974
 Luis Toro Castillo
 Alberto Yañez Carvajal

Declared Missing (Desaparecidos) of Iquique, Region of Tarapacá, Chile
 William Millar Sanhueza
 Jorge Marín Rossel
 Manuel Araya Zavala

The Executed of Iquique, Region of Tarapacá, Chile
 Luis Rojas Valenzuela (17 de septiembre de 1973)
 Oscar Ripoll Codoceo (20 de octubre de 1973)
 Julio Valenzuela Bastías (20 de octubre de 1973)
 Manuel Donoso Dañobettia (20 de octubre de 1973)
 Gerardo Poblete Fernández (21 de octubre de 1973)
 Luis Solar Welchs (23 de octubre de 1973)
 Isaias Higuera Zuñiga (11 de enero de 1974)
 Nelson Márquez Agusto (18 de enero de 1974)
 Manuel Sanhueza Mellado (10 de julio de 1974)
 Henry Torres Flores

See also 
 Pisagua Prison Camp

References 

Terrorism committed by country
Political repression in Chile during the military government (1973–1990)
1973 in Chile
Trials in Chile
Political repression in Chile
1990 in Chile
Presidency of Patricio Aylwin